John Blake Bailey  (born July 1, 1963) is an American writer and educator. Bailey is known for his literary biographies of Richard Yates, John Cheever, Charles Jackson, and Philip Roth. He is the editor of the Library of America omnibus editions of Cheever's stories and novels.

Background
Bailey grew up in Oklahoma City and attended high school at Bishop McGuinness Catholic High School, where he was friends with another future author, Dan Fagin.  He was a student at Tulane University, from which he graduated in 1985.

Bailey and his family lost their house and most of their possessions in Hurricane Katrina, an experience he wrote about in a series of articles for Slate.

In 2009–2010, Bailey was Writer in Residence at The College of William and Mary in Virginia. From 2010 to 2016, he was the Mina Hohenberg Darden Professor of Creative Writing at Old Dominion University in Norfolk, Virginia. He was succeeded by Black Elk author Joe Jackson. Bailey is a tennis enthusiast.

Sexual misconduct allegations 
On April 16, 2021, several former students of Bailey's left comments on a critical review of Bailey's Roth biography, alleging that Bailey had groomed them when they were minors.  On April 18, 2021, Bailey was dropped by his agency, the Story Factory, following these allegations of sexual misconduct, which Bailey denied. On April 20, 2021, journalists Ramon Antonio Vargas and Edward Champion first reported on these allegations in detail. Bailey was accused of grooming his former students at Lusher Middle School for sex. One former student, Eve Crawford Peyton, has accused Bailey of raping her when she was 22 years old. On April 27, 2021, he was also accused of "nonconsensual sex" by Valentina Rice, a publishing executive.

On June 10, 2021, in an article published in the Virginian-Pilot, four women at Old Dominion University, where Bailey had previously worked, accused Bailey of sexual assault and harassment. One of the women accused Bailey of “grabbing her crotch in a hot tub, forcibly trying to kiss her on campus, (and) threatening to rape her,” only stopping after she pulled a knife out and held it against his throat, the newspaper reported. Another account in the Virginian-Pilot's report concerned a female author who visited Old Dominion and recounted how Bailey had forcibly kissed her. Two graduate students also described Bailey getting "handsy" and making unwanted advances, as well as making sexually explicit comments to them.

In a statement provided to the Associated Press on April 21 by W. W. Norton & Company, the publisher announced it had "decided to pause the shipping and promotion of Philip Roth: The Biography pending any further information that may emerge." On April 28, W. W. Norton announced that it is taking the book out of print. Three weeks later, in May 2021, Skyhorse Publishing announced that it would release a paperback, ebook, and audiobook versions of the biography.

Career
After college, Bailey wrote occasional freelance pieces. He taught gifted eighth-graders at Lusher Middle School in New Orleans in the 1990s.

After publishing a long critical profile of Richard Yates, Bailey was contracted to write a full-length biography of the novelist, A Tragic Honesty: The Life and Work of Richard Yates (2003).

In 2005, Bailey was awarded a Guggenheim Fellowship to work on his biography, Cheever: A Life, which won the 2009 National Book Critics Circle Award among other honors. Bailey also edited a two-volume edition of Cheever's work for the Library of America.

Bailey published his biography of the novelist Charles Jackson, Farther & Wilder: The Lost Weekends and Literary Dreams of Charles Jackson (2013), as well as a memoir, The Splendid Things We Planned: A Family Portrait (2014).

In an interview with The New York Times published on November 17, 2012, Philip Roth said that Bailey was his official biographer and at work on that project. While Roth was alive, he gave Bailey exclusive access to papers, friends and family, and made himself available for extensive interviews. Bailey's 880-page biography of Roth, entitled Philip Roth: The Biography, was published in the United States by W. W. Norton & Company on April 6, 2021, and in the United Kingdom by Jonathan Cape on April 8, 2021.

Bailey’s primary influence is Lytton Strachey, who he has praised for his style and sense of humor. Other influences on Bailey’s work include Vladimir Nabokov, Evelyn Waugh, and PG Wodehouse.

Awards and honors 
 2000 Louisiana Humanities Teacher of the Year
2003 National Book Critics Circle Award finalist for A Tragic Honesty: The Life and Work of Richard Yates
 2005 Guggenheim Fellowship for Cheever: A Life
 2009 National Book Critics Circle Award winner for Cheever: A Life
 2009 Francis Parkman Prize winner for Cheever: A Life
 2009 Pulitzer Prize finalist for Cheever: A Life
 2009 James Tait Black Memorial Prize finalist for Cheever: A Life
 2010 Academy Award in Literature given by the American Academy of Arts and Letters
 2014 National Book Critics Circle Award (Autobiography) finalist for The Splendid Things We Planned

Bibliography
 
 
 
 
 
 
 

As editor:
John Cheever: Collected Stories & Other Writings (Library of America, 2009)
John Cheever: Complete Novels (Library of America, 2009)
The Sunnier Side and Other Stories, by Charles Jackson (Vintage/Random House, 2013)

References

External links

"How I Write" interview with Blake Bailey in The Daily Beast
Geoffrey Wolff's review of "Cheever: A Life" in The New York Times Book Review
"My Year of Hurricanes" in Slate
Blake Bailey interviewed on The Economist blog
Blake Bailey interviewed on The Diane Rehm Show

1963 births
20th-century American male writers
20th-century American non-fiction writers
21st-century American male writers
21st-century American non-fiction writers
American biographers
American literary editors
Living people
American male biographers
Old Dominion University faculty
Schoolteachers from Louisiana
Tulane University alumni
Writers from Oklahoma City